The Ferrari 296 is a sports car built since 2022 by Italian constructor Ferrari. It has a rear mid-engine, rear-wheel-drive layout and is known internally within Ferrari as the type F171. The 296 is a two-seater, offered as a 'GTB' coupé, and a 'GTS' folding hard-top convertible. A plug-in hybrid, its power train combines a 120-degree block-angle V6, with twin turbos and an electric drive fitted in between the engine and gearbox. The 296 can be driven in electric-only mode for short distances, to comply with use in urban zero-emission zones.

Unveiled on 24 June 2021, the 296 is Ferrari's first stock model with 6-cylinders. Considered to be Ferrari's 'entry-level' car, its power pack puts out a combined , giving the 296 a power-to-weight ratio of 560 Hp / tonne.

History
The 296 GTB was presented as the first "real Ferrari with just six cylinders" on 24 June 2021. Previously, such models were both designed and built by Ferrari, but marketed as a new, entry-level Dino brand, below Ferrari's exclusively V12-model policy, until 1974. The new car is scheduled to go on sale in 2022. The 296 in the model name reprises the original Dinos's naming scheme, indicating the engine's displacement and the number of cylinders. GTB stands for Gran Turismo Berlinetta.

Engine

Variants

Assetto Fiorano
The Assetto Fiorano is the track-oriented version of the 296 GTB.

GTS
The 296 GTS is an open-top variant of the 296 GTB with a folding hardtop. The GTS weighs  more than the GTB due to chassis reinforcing components but maintains equal performance.

Promotion 
To promote the launch of the 296 GTB, Ferrari collaborated with Epic Games to add the Ferrari 296 GTB as a drivable vehicle to online battle royale video game Fortnite Battle Royale, for Chapter 2: Season 7 of the game. The 296 GTBs were removed from the game after Chapter 2: Season 7 ended.

Motorsport

296 GT3
In 2022, Ferrari introduced the 296 GT3, intended to replace the Ferrari 488 GT3 from 2023 onwards. The car made its racing debut at the 2023 24 Hours of Daytona.

296 Challenge 
The Ferrari 296 Challenge will be introduced in 2024 to replace the Ferrari 488 Challenge Evo.

See also 
 List of production cars by power output

References

External links
 Ferrari 296 GTB official website

296 GTB
Rear mid-engine, rear-wheel-drive vehicles
Plug-in hybrid vehicles
Sports cars
Cars introduced in 2021